Gediminas (ca. 1275–1341) was a Grand Duke of Lithuania.

Gediminas may also refer to:
Gediminas (given name), a list of people with the given name
Gediminas Avenue, a street of Vilnius, Lithuania
Gediminas bridge, a bridge in Kupiškis, Lithuania
Columns of Gediminas, a symbol of Lithuania
Gediminas' Tower, part of the Upper Castle in Vilnius, Lithuania
Order of the Lithuanian Grand Duke Gediminas, a Lithuanian Presidential Award
Vilnius Gediminas Technical University, a school in Vilnius, Lithuania
Letters of Gediminas, six surviving transcripts of letters written in 1323–1324 by Grand Duke Gediminas